Charles Lee Sieminski (July 3, 1940 – May 16, 2020) was an American football player who played for the San Francisco 49ers, the Detroit Lions and the Atlanta Falcons of the National Football League (NFL). He played college football at Penn State University. After his playing career was over, he served as a high school football coach and sports official in his native Northeastern Pennsylvania for many years.

References

1940 births
2020 deaths
American football defensive tackles
Penn State Nittany Lions football players
San Francisco 49ers players
Atlanta Falcons players
Detroit Lions players
Players of American football from Pennsylvania
People from Swoyersville, Pennsylvania